The following is a list of notable deaths in June 2003.

Entries for each day are listed alphabetically by surname. A typical entry lists information in the following sequence:
 Name, age, country of citizenship at birth, subsequent country of citizenship (if applicable), reason for notability, cause of death (if known), and reference.

June 2003

1
Sidney Bloom, 82, British restaurateur, founded the famous Bloom's kosher restaurant in London.
Johnny Hopp, 86, American baseball player (St. Louis Cardinals, Boston Braves, Pittsburgh Pirates).
Yevgeny Matveyev, 81, Russian actor and film director.
Pete Sivess, 89, American baseball player (Philadelphia Phillies).
Eero Virtanen, 87, Finnish wrestler (men's lightweight wrestling at the 1948 Summer Olympics).
Peter Yarranton, 78, English rugby player and administrator, Rugby Football Union president.

2
Fred Blassie, 85, American professional wrestler, renowned as "The Hollywood Fashion Plate".
Boycho Branzov, 57, Bulgarian basketball player (men's basketball at the 1968 Summer Olympics).
Richard Cusack, 77, American actor (The Fugitive, High Fidelity, Chain Reaction).
John Gerrard, 82, British police officer.
Donald Jack, 78, Canadian playwright and novelist.
Burke Marshall, 80, American lawyer and head of the Civil Rights Division.
Caryl Micklem, 79, British nonconformist minister and broadcaster.
John Robin Stephenson, 72, British army officer and cricket administrator, Secretary of MCC.
Ray Wehba, 86, American professional football player (USC, Brooklyn Dodgers, Green Bay Packers).
James White, 89, Irish art expert and Director of the National Gallery of Ireland.
J. R. Worsley, 79, British acupuncturist.

3
Sir Anthony Barrowclough, 78, British lawyer and public servant, Parliamentary Commissioner for Administration.
Ginaw Bilog, 50, Filipino poet, lingering illness.
Peter Bromley, 74, British sports broadcaster, BBC Radio's voice of horse racing for 40 years (1961–2001).
John Jympson, 72, British film editor.
Fabrice Salanson, 23, French road cyclist, heart attack.
Felix de Weldon, 96, Austrian-American sculptor (Marine Corps War Memorial).

4
Muhammad Abdul Bari, 72-73, Bangladeshi academic, linguist and Islamic scholar.
Serafín Rojo, 77, Spanish cartoonist and painter.
Nurul Amin Talukdar, 57, Bangladeshi politician.
Shooby Taylor, 73, African American jazz vocalist.

5
Thomas Speakman Barnett, 93, Canadian politician (member of Parliament of Canada for Comox—Alberni, British Columbia).
Sir John Fairclough, 72, British computer designer, Government Chief Scientific Adviser.
Jürgen Möllemann, 57, German minister.
Keijo Vanhala, 62, Finnish modern pentathlete (individual pentathlon, team pentathlon at the 1964 Summer Olympics).
Meir Vilner, 84, Israeli politician, last surviving signatory to Israeli Declaration of Independence and chairman of the Communist Party of Israel.

6
Ken Grimwood, 59, American author, heart attack.
Douglas Henson, 73, English cricketer.
Thomas Jackson, 78, British trade unionist.
Ray Medeiros, 77, American baseball player (Cincinnati Reds).
Spurgeon Neel, 83, American U.S. Army physician, pioneered the development of battlefield casualty evacuation.
Dave Rowberry, 62, English pianist and organist.
Shivnath Singh, 56, Indian long-distance runner (1976 Olympics men's marathon, 1980 Olympics men's marathon).
Keith Winning, 75, Australian rugby player.

7
Stanley Betts, 91, English Anglican bishop (Dean of Rochester).
R. W. G. Dennis, 92, British botanist.
Greg Garrett, 56, American baseball player (California Angels, Cincinnati Reds).
Trevor Goddard, 40, British actor (JAG, Mortal Kombat, Pirates of the Caribbean: The Curse of the Black Pearl), accidental drug overdose.
Tony McAuley, 63, BBC Northern Ireland broadcaster & filmmaker.
Roger Nelson, 47, American skydiver, founder of Skydive Chicago, skydiving accident.

8
Alun Davies, 80, British Anglican priest, Dean of Llandaff.
Herschel Burke Gilbert, 85, American orchestrator and composer of film and television scores, complications of a stroke.
Colin Legum, 84, South African journalist and writer.
Leighton Rees, 63, Welsh darts player.

9
Wilkie D. Ferguson, 65, American lawyer and judge (U.S. District Judge of the U.S. District Court for the Southern District of Florida), leukemia.
David Grayden, 79, Australian politician.
Indradeep Sinha, 88, Indian freedom fighter and communist leader.
German Sveshnikov, 66, Soviet fencer (Olympic medals: 1960 gold medal, 1964 gold medal, 1968 silver medal).
Sid Williams, 83, English footballer.

10
Charles Harrison Brown, 82, American politician (U.S. Representative for Missouri's 7th congressional district).
Donald Regan, 84, Chief of Staff and Treasury Secretary during the Reagan administration.
Sir Bernard Williams, 73, British moral philosopher.
Phil Williams, 64, Welsh politician, member of the National Assembly for Wales for South Wales East.

11
David Brinkley, 82, American broadcast journalist (The Huntley–Brinkley Report, NBC Nightly News, This Week with David Brinkley).
Pankaj Charan Das, 78, Indian classical dancer.
William Marshall, 78, American actor, director and opera singer, complications from Alzheimer's disease and diabetes.
Guy Willatt, 85, English cricket player.

12
Itamar Assumpção, 53, Brazilian songwriter and composer.
Joseph L. Fleiss, 65, American professor of biostatistics.
Anna M. Louw, 89, South African author.
Gregory Peck, 87, American actor (To Kill a Mockingbird, Roman Holiday, The Yearling).
Sam Schulman, 93, American sports businessman (Seattle SuperSonics, San Diego Chargers), blood disease.

13
Harold Ashby, 78, American jazz tenor saxophonist (Duke Ellington Orchestra).
Robin Russell, 14th Duke of Bedford, 63, British peer.
Lucile Bluford, 91, American civil rights activist, editor and publisher (Kansas City Call).
Gene Hayden, 68, American baseball player (Cincinnati Redlegs).
Silvio Pedroni, 85, Italian racing cyclist (men's individual road race, men's team road race at the 1948 Summer Olympics).

14
James Cameron, 73, British professor of forensic medicine (FINA) and forensic scientist (A Cry in the Dark).
Jimmy Knepper, 75, American jazz trombonist, complications of Parkinson's disease.
Anna Larsson, 81, Swedish athlete.
John Weld, 98, American newspaper reporter and writer (Don't You Cry for Me, Young Man in Paris, September Song).
Dale Whittington, 43, American race car driver.
Pete Wysocki, 54, American professional football player (Western Michigan, Washington Redskins).

15
Enrico Baj, 78, Italian artist and art writer.
Hume Cronyn, 91, Canadian-born American actor (The Seventh Cross, Cocoon, The Pelican Brief).
Sir Ralph Kilner Brown, 93, British jurist and athlete.
Johnny Miles, 97, Canadian marathon runner.
Philip Stone, 79, British actor (The Shining, Indiana Jones and the Temple of Doom, A Clockwork Orange).
Bill Wentworth, 95, Australian politician (member of Australian Parliament for Mackellar).
Sir James Willis, 79, Australian admiral and Chief of Naval Staff.

16
Asa Baber, 66, American writer and magazine columnist for Playboy.
Les Benjamin, 78, Canadian politician (MP for Regina—Lake Centre, Regina West, Regina—Lumsden, Saskatchewan).
Sir William Crawford, 85, British admiral.
John L. Grove, 82, American inventor and industrialist.
Marjorie Pyles Honzik, 95, American developmental psychologist.
Peter Redgrove, 71, British poet.
Carlos Rivas, 78, American actor, prostate cancer.
Georg Henrik von Wright, 87, Finnish philosopher, professor and writer.

17
Cheryl Byron, 56, Trinidad visual artist, dancer and singer.
Frank M. Clark, 87, American politician (U.S. Representative for Pennsylvania's 25th congressional district).
Paul Hirst, 57, British sociologist and political theorist.
Robert M. Ricketts, 83, American orthodontist.
Grover C. Stephens, 78, American marine biologist and comparative physiologist.

18
Guy Bara, 79, Belgian comic strip writer and artist (Max l'explorateur).
Sir Kenneth Cross, 91, British Royal Air Force commander.
Paul Daisley, 45, British politician, colorectal cancer.
Larry Doby, 79, American baseball player (Cleveland Indians) and member of the MLB Hall of Fame, second black man to play in MLB.
Ernest Martin, 42, American murderer, execution by lethal injection.

19
Jack Butterworth, Baron Butterworth, 85, British lawyer, academic and life peer (House of Lords 1985–2003).
Glen Grant, 56, Hawaiian historian, folklorist and author, cancer.
Peanuts Hucko, 85, American big band musician.
Rafael Ileto, 82, Filipino army general and politician.
Laura Sadler, 22, British television actress, accidental fall.
Belding Hibbard Scribner, 82, American physician.

20
LaMar Baker, 87, American politician (U.S. Representative for Tennessee's 3rd congressional district).
Fielder Cook, 80, American television and film director, producer, and writer, complications from a stroke.
Raymond Serra, 66, American actor.
Bob Stump, 76, American politician (U.S. Representative for Arizona's 3rd congressional district), myelodysplasia.
Vic Vasicek, 77, American football player (Buffalo Bills, Los Angeles Rams).
Peter Wright, 83, British potter and sculptor.

21
George Axelrod, 81, American screenwriter (Bus Stop, Breakfast at Tiffany's, The Manchurian Candidate).
Piet Dankert, 69, Dutch politician, State Secretary for Foreign Affairs and President of the European Parliament.
Charles Dédéyan, 93, French literary historian.
Hiroko Matsumoto, 66, Japanese fashion model.
Jason Moran, 35, Australian criminal, murdered.
Roger Neilson, 69, Canadian ice hockey coach, head coach for eight different NHL teams from 1977 to 2002.
Leon Uris, 78, Jewish-American author.
Sergei Vronsky, 67, Soviet cinematographer

22
Vasil Bykau, 79, Belarusian writer.
Joseph Chaikin, 67, American theatre director, actor, and playwright.
Brian Dillon, 77, British lawyer and judge.
Harry Kinzy, 92, American baseball player (Chicago White Sox).
Shelby Starner, 19, American singer-songwriter and musician, complications from bulimia nervosa.

23
Maynard Jackson, 65, first African-American Mayor of Atlanta, Georgia.
Doug Ring, 84, Australian cricketer.
Fred Sandback, American minimalist sculptor, suicide.
Alexander Sidelnikov, 52, Soviet ice hockey player.
Bob Smith, 75, American baseball player (Boston Red Sox, Chicago Cubs, Cleveland Indians).

24
Jack Bruner, 78, American baseball player (Chicago White Sox, St. Louis Browns).
Wataru Kubo, 74, Japanese politician.
Barbara Weeks, 89, American actress (Ziegfeld Follies, Now I'll Tell).
Dee Wells, 78, American broadcaster, journalist and novelist.

25
Rene Cayetano, 68, Filipino lawyer, television presenter, journalist and politician, abdominal cancer.
Johnny Dauwe, 37, Belgian Olympic cyclist, suicide.
Lester Maddox, 87, segregationist Governor of the State of Georgia, complications from pneumonia and prostate cancer.
Warnasena Rasaputra, 75, Sri Lankan economist.
Preston Washington, 54, American minister in Harlem, known for opening his church to tourists.
Shun Yashiro, 70, Japanese actor and voice actor, stroke.

26
John G. Adams, 91, American lawyer, counsel in the Army–McCarthy hearings.
Marc-Vivien Foé, 28, Cameroonian footballer collapsed and died on the football pitch in Lyon.
Sir Denis Thatcher, 1st Baronet, 88, British businessman, Spouse of the Prime Minister (1979–1990).
Strom Thurmond, 100, Governor of South Carolina, United States Republican Senator from South Carolina, Presidential candidate (as a Dixiecrat), and the only centenarian to serve in the U.S. Congress.
Peter Waters, 73, British bookbinder and one of the world's leading authorities on book conservation.
Philip Weekes, 83, Welsh mining engineer.

27
Magne Aarøen, 59, Norwegian politician.
Gerald Balfour, 4th Earl of Balfour, 77, British hereditary peer (House of Lords 1968–1999), businessman and politician.
Prince Carl Bernadotte, 92, Swedish prince.
David Newman, 66, American screenwriter (Bonnie and Clyde, There Was a Crooked Man..., What's Up, Doc?).
Ken Smith, 64, British poet.
Sir John Stokes, 85, British politician (Member of Parliament for Oldbury and Halesowen, Halesowen and Stourbridge).

28
George Baxt, 80, American screenwriter and author (Circus of Horrors, The City of the Dead), complication from heart surgery.
Kevin Belcher, 42, American professional football player (University of Texas at El Paso, New York Giants).
Robert Muir Graves, 72, American golf course architect, cancer.
Rio Kishida, 57, Japanese playwright and director.
Joan Lowery Nixon, 76, American journalist and author, pancreatic cancer.
Wim Slijkhuis, 80, Dutch athlete (two-time bronze medal winner at 1948 Summer Olympics: 1500 metres, 5000 metres).

29
Rod Amateau, 79, American screenwriter and director (The Many Loves of Dobie Gillis, The George Burns and Gracie Allen Show), cerebral hemorrhage.
Diane Geppi-Aikens, 40, American lacrosse coach, brain tumor.
Katharine Hepburn, 96, American actress (The African Queen, The Lion in Winter, On Golden Pond).
James Kelly, 89, American abstract expressionist artist.
Gregor MacGregor, 69, Scottish Anglican prelate, Bishop of Moray, Ross and Caithness.
Norman O'Connor, 81, American priest and jazz musician.

30
Noor Alam, 73, Pakistani field hockey player (Olympic field hockey: 1956 silver medal, 1960 gold medal).
William J. J. Gordon, 83, American psychologist and inventor.
Buddy Hackett, 78, American comedian and actor (It's a Mad, Mad, Mad, Mad World, The Little Mermaid, The Love Bug).
Robert McCloskey, 88, children's book writer and illustrator.
Constance Smith, 75, Irish actress.

References 

2003-06
 06